is a Japanese actor represented by Takarai Project. His hobbies are cooking and photography and his skills are judo, dancing buyō, and speaking Miyazaki dialect.

Filmography

TV series
NHK

Nippon TV

Tokyo Broadcasting System

Fuji Television

TV Asahi

Broadcasting stations

Other

Films

Theater

References

External links
 

Japanese male actors
1948 births
Living people
People from Miyazaki Prefecture